Catallaxy or catallactics is an alternative expression for the word "economy". Whereas the word economy suggests that people in a community possess a common and congruent set of values and goals, catallaxy suggests that the emergent properties of a market (prices, division of labor, growth, etc.) are the outgrowths of the diverse and disparate goals of the individuals in a community.

Aristotle was the first person to define the word "economy" as ‘the art of household management’. As is still a common method of explanation today, Aristotle tried to explain complex market phenomena through an analogy between a household and a state, take for example the modern analogy between the national debt of a country's government and a simple consumer's credit card debt. Aristotle used a common Greek word 'oikonomia' that meant "to direct a single household," and used it to mean the management of an entire city-state. The word catallaxy aims to provide a more accurate and inclusive word for the market phenomenon of groups of households, in which participants are free to pursue diverse ends of their own.

After being discussed by Ludwig von Mises the term catallaxy was later made popular by Friedrich Hayek who defines it as "the order brought about by the mutual adjustment of many individual economies in a market".

Catallaxy may also be used to refer to a marketplace of ideas, especially a place where people holding diverse political ideologies come together to gain deeper understanding of a wide range of political orientations.

Catallaxy also becomes a new dimension in software design and network architecture.

See also 

 Catallactics
 Demonstrated preference
 Partial knowledge
 Flat organization
 Invisible hand
 Tax choice
 The Fatal Conceit
 The Use of Knowledge in Society
 Wisdom of the crowd

References

Notes

Austrian School
Self-organization

de:Katallaxie
es:Catalaxia
fr:Catallaxie
pl:Katalaktyka
ro:Catalaxie
ru:Каталлактика